Kalecik may refer to:

Places
Kalecik, Ankara in Turkey
Kalecik, Çermik
Kalecik, Eğil
Kalecik, Erzincan
Kalecik, Hınıs
Kalecik, Karakoçan
Kalecik, Mecitözü
Kalecik, Tercan
Kalecik Dam (Elazığ), a dam in Elazığ Province of Turkey
Kalecik Dam (Osmaniye), a dam in Osmaniye Province of Turkey
Gastria, Cyprus, called Kalecik in Northern Cyprus

Others
Kalecik Karası, a Turkish grape variety